La Cava may refer to:

Legend
Florinda la Cava, a figure of Spanish legend

People
Francesco La Cava (1876–1958), Italian physician and writer
Gregory La Cava (1892–1952), American film director
Nicholas la Cava (born 1986), American rower

Places
Cava de' Tirreni, Italian town and commune
La Cava, a community in Deltebre, Spain
, a Celtiberian settlement
La Trinità della Cava, monastery in Cava de' Tirreni
Palacio de La Cava, a palace located in Toledo, Spain

Other
La Cava (musical), a musical based on the legend
La Cava Bible, a bible produced at the monastery

See also
Cava (disambiguation)